The Texas Afghanistan Campaign Medal is the fifth highest campaign/service award that may be issued to a service member of the Texas Military Forces.

Eligibility 
The Texas Afghanistan Campaign Medal shall be issued to any service member of the Texas Military Forces who:

 After 6 October 2001
Was mobilized into service under command of the United States Armed Forces (Title 10)
 In support of Operation Enduring Freedom
 Without regard to location the service member was deployed

Authority

Awarding 
Texas Government Code, Chapter 437 (Texas Military), Subchapter H. (Awards), Section 355 (Other Awards), Line 14.

Legal 
The Texas Iraqi Campaign Medal was established by Senator Kirk Watson in Senate Bill 356, authorized by the Eighty-second Texas Legislature, and approved by Governor Rick Perry on May 28, 2011, effective same date.

Description

Notable recipients

See also 

 Awards and decorations of the Texas Military
 Awards and decorations of the Texas government
 Texas Military Forces
 Texas Military Department
 List of conflicts involving the Texas Military

References 

Awards and decorations of the Texas Military Forces
Texas Military Forces
Texas Military Department